Nahari or  can refer to:

Places
 , glacier in the country of Georgia
 , plain in Afghanistan
 Nahari, Kōchi, town in Japan
 Nahari Station, railway station in Nahari, Kōchi
 Nahari, Madhubani, village in India

People
 , Saudi journalist
 , researcher
 , an Israeli judge
 Meshulam Nahari (b. 1951), Israeli politician
 Moshe Ya'ish al-Nahari (/ 1978–2008), Yemeni Jewish Hebrew teacher, kosher butcher, and murder victim
 Nahari, also called  the Beerothite, one of David's Mighty Warriors
 , Israeli television presenter
 Shlomo Nahari, Israeli association football player
  (b. 1985), Israeli actor

Other
 , the Swahili word for the constellation Eridanus
 Nahari language, Indo-Aryan language spoken in the states of Chhattisgarh and Odisha in India

See also
 Nagari (disambiguation)
 Nahar (disambiguation)
 Nehari (disambiguation)
 Nihari, stew from the Indian subcontinent consisting of slow-cooked meat flavored with long pepper